Nuer may refer to:
 Nuer people
 Nuer language or Thok Nath

Language and nationality disambiguation pages